Susie Laska (born November 1, 1979 in Cobden, Ontario) is an ice hockey player formerly with the now-defunct Ottawa Senators of the CWHL.

Playing career
Laska played her university hockey with the University of Toronto Blues from 1998 to 2003. She won a CIS championship in 2001 and served as the team captain in 2002-03. She joined the Ottawa Raiders in 2003-04 and now serves as the team captain. She helped the Ottawa Raiders win an NWHL East Division title in 2005-06.

At the international level, Laska represented Canada's U-22 hockey team in 2000-01.

External links
CWHL web site

1979 births
Canadian women's ice hockey players
Living people